Buckshot is a census-designated place (CDP) in Yuma County, Arizona, United States. The population was 153 at the 2010 census.

Redondo Lake, a reservoir holding seepage from the Gila
Gravity Main Canal, is located to the north of Buckshot.

Geography
Buckshot is located at  (32.7404, −114.482886), in the Gila River Valley.

Demographics

Buckshot first appeared on the 2010 U.S. Census as a census-designated place (CDP).

As of the 2010 census, there were 153 people living in the CDP: 85 male and 68 female. 29 were 19 years old or younger, 10 were ages 20–34, 13 were between the ages of 35 and 49, 28 were between 50 and 64, and the remaining 73 were aged 65 and above. The median age was 63.8 years.

The racial makeup of the CDP was 92.2% White, 3.3% American Indian 0.7% Black or African American, 2.0% Other, and 2% two or more races.  29.4% of the population were Hispanic or Latino of any race.

There were 66 households in the CDP, 51 family households (77.3%) and 15 non-family households (22.7%), with an average household size of 2.32. Of the family households, 44 were married couples living together, 1 single father and 6 single mothers; while the non-family households included 14 adults living alone: 10 male and 4 female.

The CDP contained 75 housing units, of which 66 were occupied and 9 were vacant.

References

External links
Redondo Lake at the Arizona Game and Fish Department

Census-designated places in Yuma County, Arizona